Marquel Waldron (born 1 February 1988) is a Bermudian international footballer who plays club football for the PHC Zebras, as a defender.

Club career
Waldron played for local league side PHC Zebras before joining the University of West Florida in summer 2008. He later played for Bermuda Hogges in the USL Second Division.

In October 2012 he had a trial with English side Barnet.

International career
He made his debut for Bermuda in a December 2007 friendly match against Saint Kitts and Nevis and earned a total of 6 caps, scoring no goals. He has represented his country in 1 FIFA World Cup qualification match. He also was captain of Bermuda U-20.

Personal life
Waldron has his own entertainment activity business, called Xtreme Sports.

References

External links

 Player profile - West Florida University

1988 births
Living people
People from Warwick Parish
Association football defenders
Bermudian footballers
Bermudian expatriate footballers
Bermuda international footballers
Bermuda Hogges F.C. players
Panama City Beach Pirates players
PHC Zebras players
Expatriate soccer players in the United States
USL League Two players
West Florida Argonauts men's soccer players
Bermuda under-20 international footballers